Hong Jeong-woon (born 29 November 1994) is a South Korean footballer who plays as centre-back for Daegu FC.

Career
Born on 29 November 1994, Hong joined K League 2 side Daegu FC in January 2016.

Career statistics

Honours
Daegu FC
 Korean FA Cup: 2018

References

External links 

1994 births
Living people
South Korean footballers
South Korea under-23 international footballers
Association football central defenders
Daegu FC players
K League 2 players
K League 1 players
Myongji University alumni